The Countess de Hoernle Student Life Center is a multi-purpose arena on the Palm Beach campus of Keiser University in West Palm Beach, Florida.  With a capacity of 1,600 people, it is home to the Keiser University Seahawks basketball and volleyball teams, and also to the Palm Beach Titans of the Continental Basketball League.

References

Indoor arenas in Florida
Basketball venues in Florida
Sports venues in Palm Beach County, Florida
Buildings and structures in West Palm Beach, Florida